= Phyxia =

Ancient Greek Town

Coordinates: 36°50′51″N 27°11′43″E

Phyxia was a town of ancient Greece on the island of Cos.
